The Nansen Refugee Award is a medal issued annually by the United Nations High Commissioner for Refugees (UNHCR) to an individual, group, or organization in recognition of outstanding service to the cause of refugees, displaced, or stateless people. The award was established by UNHCR the organizations first High Comissioner, Gerrit Jan van Heuven Goedhart 1954 as a tribute to Fridtjof Nansen. Fridtjof Nansen was a Nobel Peace Prize laureate, explorer, and League of Nations High Commissioner for Refugees and the award was established in honour of his work to support refugees. Van Heuven Goedhart felt that creating an award would increase the world's attention to the needs of refugees and increase global refugee aid.

The inaugural awardee was Eleanor Roosevelt in 1954. Every year, the prize is presented at a ceremony in the Bâtiment des Forces Motrices, in Geneva. The medal is accompanied by a $150,000 US dollar prize. The award was expanded in 2017 to include regional winners for Africa, Asia, the Americas, the Middle East, and Europe.

In 2018, the award was described as the "other Nobel" prize by NPR.

List of annual laureates

Lists of regional laureates

See also 

 Nansen International Office for Refugees

Notes

References

External links
 List of winners 1954 to 2012, UNHCR (Spanish)
 Nansen Refugee Award, official website
 United Nations High Commissioner for Refugees, official website
 Pictures of the 2012 Nansen Refugee Award ceremony
 Interview with “Mama” Hawa Aden Mohamed, 2012 Nansen Refugee Award, by Global Education Magazine, in the special edition of World Refugee Day.

Awards established in 1954
Refugee award
Humanitarian and service awards
United Nations High Commissioner for Refugees
United Nations awards
Nansen Refugee Award laureates